Scopula subquadrata is a moth of the  family Geometridae. It is found in the Neotropics, including Brazil, Jamaica, Puerto Rico and Honduras.

References

Moths described in 1858
subquadrata
Moths of Central America
Moths of the Caribbean
Moths of South America